The 24th Tactical Air Support Squadron (24 TASS) was a ground attack squadron of the United States Air Force. It was last active at Nellis Air Force Base in Nevada, prior to being inactivated during December 2020.

Proving ground unit
The first predecessor of the 24 TASS was the 24th Bombardment Squadron (Light) which was activated in late 1939 as a test unit for light bombardment aircraft at Maxwell Field, Alabama.  The squadron was disbanded in the spring of 1942 in a reorganization of United States Army Air Forces operational testing units in the spring of 1942.

Mapping in the Pacific
The second predecessor of the squadron was activated in the fall of 1942 as the 24th Photographic Mapping Squadron.  After training in the United States under Second Air Force, the squadron deployed to the China Burma India Theater, where it performed combat mapping. mostly with North American B-25 Mitchells and Consolidated B-24 Liberators equipped with vertical and oblique Mapping cameras until moving to Clark Field in the Philippines, where it was inactivated in 1946. In Asia, the squadron deployed detachments to a number of locations, although the headquarters remained in Guskhara Airfield, India.

Air Force reserve
The squadron was activated again in the reserves in 1947 as the 24th Reconnaissance Squadron, but apparently was not equipped before inactivating when Continental Air Command reorganized under the Wing Base Organization plan in 1949.

Strategic Air Command
The squadron was activated in the regular Air Force in 1951 as the 24th Strategic Reconnaissance Squadron at Lake Charles Air Force Base, Louisiana and equipped with Boeing RB-29 Superfortresses.  When its parent 68th Strategic Reconnaissance Wing converted to a bombardment mission in 1952, the squadron became the 24th Bombardment Squadron, but was inactivated in 1953, and its personnel and equipment were transferred to the 656th Bombardment Squadron, which was simultaneously activated.

Helicopter operations
The 24th Helicopter Squadron was activated in 1956 at Sewart Air Force Base, Tennessee.  After several months of training the squadron moved to Tachikawa Air Base, Japan, where it served until 1960.  The transfer was made on an aircraft carrier of the United States Navy. The unit's mission was to maintain helicopter logistics airlift capability, to perform air land supply operations, scheduled and special airlift operations, and conduct training. Detachment 2 of the squadron was attached to the 41st Air Division to provide logistical support to the division's remote radar sites. In 1958 and 1959 the squadron returned to Burma when it participated in Operation South Bound, which provided assistance to the Burmese Air Force in combatting local insurrectionists.

Operations in Central and South America
The squadron was redesignated the 24th Special Operations Squadron and activated in Panama in 1969.  In 1985, the squadron was consolidated with its two predecessor units.  The consolidated squadron became the 24th Tactical Air Support Squadron in 1987, and was inactivated in the spring of 1991.

Close air support training
The 24 Tactical Air Support Squadron was activated on 2 March 2018 at Nellis Air Force Base, Nevada. It was the USAF's Forward Air Controller – Airborne schoolhouse for the Lockheed Martin F-16 Fighting Falcon as well as supporting the joint terminal attack controller qualification course and Weapons School. 

The squadron was inactivated during a ceremony at Nellis on 23 December 2020.

Lineage
 24th Bombardment Squadron
 Constituted as the 24th Attack-Bombardment Squadron on 1 August 1939
 Redesignated 24th Bombardment Squadron (Light) on 28 September 1939
 Activated on 1 December 1939
 Disbanded on 1 May 1942
 Reconstituted on 19 September 1985 and consolidated with 24th Bombardment Squadron, Medium and 24th Composite Squadron as 24th Composite Squadron

 24th Strategic Reconnaissance Squadron Constituted as the 24th Photographic Mapping Squadron on 14 July 1942
 Activated on 2 September 1942
 Redesignated as 24th Photographic Squadron, Heavy on 6 February 1943
 Redesignated as 24th Combat Mapping Squadron on 11 August 1943
 Inactivated on 15 June 1946
 Redesignated 24th Reconnaissance Squadron, Very Long Range, Photographic, Radar Counter-Measures on 13 May 1947
 Activated in the reserve on 12 July 1947
 Inactivated on 27 June 1949
 Redesignated 24th Strategic Reconnaissance Squadron, Medium, Photographic on 4 October 1951
 Activated on 10 October 1951
 Redesignated 24th Bombardment Squadron, Medium on 16 June 1952
 Redesignated 24th Strategic Reconnaissance Squadron, Medium and inactivated on 16 January 1953
 Consolidated on 19 September 1985 with 24th Bombardment Squadron, (Light) and 24th Composite Squadron as 24th Composite Squadron 24th Tactical Air Support Squadron
 Constituted as the 24th Helicopter Squadron on 24 February 1956
 Activated on 9 July 1956
 Inactivated on 8 March 1960
 Redesignated 24th Special Operations Squadron on 6 March 1969
 Activated on 18 March 1969
 Redesignated 24th Composite Squadron on 15 November 1973
 Inactivated on 1 July 1975
 Activated on 1 January 1976
 Consolidated with 24th Bombardment Squadron, Medium and 24th Bombardment Squadron, Medium on 19 September 1985
 Redesignated 24th Tactical Air Support Squadron''' on 1 January 1987
 Inactivated on 31 March 1991
 Activated on 2 March 2018
 Inactivated on 23 December 2020

Assignments
 23d Composite Group (later Air Corps Proving Ground Detachment, Air Forces Proving Ground Group): 1 December 1939 – 1 May 1942
 5th Photographic Group (later 5th Photographic Reconnaissance and Mapping Group, 5th Photographic Reconnaissance Group), 2 September 1942
 Third Air Force, 9 October 1943
 III Reconnaissance Command, 12 October 1943
 Army Air Forces, India-Burma Sector, 26 December 1943 (attached to 5306th Photographic and Reconnaissance Group (Provisional), 26 December 1943 – 17 January 1944, Tenth Air Force)
 Tenth Air Force, 7 March 1944
 8th Photographic Reconnaissance Group (later 8th Reconnaissance Group), 25 April 1944
 Army Air Forces, India-Burma Theater, 20 September 1945
 Thirteenth Air Force, 28 January 1946
 313th Bombardment Wing, 1 April 1946 − 15 June 1946
 68th Reconnaissance Group, 12 July 1947 − 27 June 1949
 68th Strategic Reconnaissance Group, 10 October 1951 (attached to 68th Strategic Reconnaissance Wing)
 68th Bombardment Wing, 16 June 1952 − 16 January 1953
 Eighteenth Air Force, 9 July 1956
 315th Air Division: 13 October 1956 − 8 March 1960
 24th Special Operations Wing (later 24th Special Operations Group, 24th Composite Group), 18 March 1969 − 1 July 1975
 24th Composite Wing, 1 January 1976
 USAF Southern Air Division, 31 January 1987
 24th Composite Wing, 1 January 1989
 Air Forces Panama, 15 February − 31 March 1991
 57th Operations Group, 2 March 2018 – 23 December 2020

Stations

 Maxwell Field, Alabama, 1 December 1939
 Orlando Army Air Base, Florida, 2 September 1940
 Eglin Field, Florida 29 June 1941 − 1 May 1942
 Peterson Field, Colorado, 2 September 1942
 Will Rogers Field, Oklahoma, 13 October 1943
 Camp Anza, California, 8 November 1943 − 18 November 1943
 Guskhara, India, 5 January 1944
 Calcutta, India, 23 December 1945
 Kanchrapara, India, 17 December 1945 − 17 January 1946 (air echelon moved to Clark Field on 18 December)
 Clark Field, Luzon, Philippines, 29 January 1946 − 15 June 1946

 Hamilton Field (later Hamilton Air Force Base), California, 12 July 1947 − 27 June 1949
 Lake Charles Air Force Base, Louisiana, 10 October 1951 − 16 January 1953
 Sewart Air Force Base, Tennessee, 9 July – 25 September 1956
 Itami Air Base, Japan, 10 October 1956
 Showa Air Station, Japan, 1 July 1957 − 8 March 1960
 Howard Air Force Base, 18 March 1969 − 1 July 1975
 Howard Air Force Base (later Howard Air Base), 1 January 1976 − 31 March 1991
 Nellis Air Force Base, 2 March 2018 – 23 December 2020

Detachment Locations during World War II 
 Hsinching Airfield, China, 17 March 1944 – 9 April 1944, 27 April 1944 − c. 1 July 1944, October–November 1944
 Jorhat Airfield, India, 9 April 1944 – 22 April 1944
 Liuchow Airfield, China, 10 July 1944 – 22 September 1944
 Chanyi Airfield, China, 22 September 1944 – 17 February 1945
 Pengshan Airfield, China, November 1944
 Tulihal and Cox's Bazar, India, February 1945 − c. April 1945

Aircraft

 Curtiss A-12 Shrike:1940–1942
 Curtiss A-18 Shrike: 1940–1942
 Douglas A-20 Havoc: 1940–1942
 Stearman XA-21: 1940–1942
 Martin B-10: 1940–1942
 Martin B-12: 1940–1942
 Douglas B-18 Bolo:1940–1942

 Douglas B-23 Dragon: 1940–1942
 Consolidated B-24 Liberator(F-7): 1943, 1944–1946
 North American B-25 Mitchell (F-9): 1940–1942, 1944
 Boeing RB-29 Superfortress (F-13): 1946; 1952–1953
 Lockheed C-36 Electra: 1940–1942
 Lockheed C-40 Electra: 1940–1942
 Bell YFM-1 Airacuda: 1940–1942

 Consolidated PB-2: 1940–1942
 Stearman PT-17 Kaydet: 1940–1942
 Douglas SBD-1 Dauntless: 1940–1942
 Piasecki H-21: 1956–unknown
 General Dynamics F-16 Fighting Falcon: 2018–2020

Awards and Campaigns

References

Notes
 Explanatory notes

 Citations

Bibliography

 
 
 
 AF Pamphlet 900-2, Unit Decorations, Awards and Campaign Participation Credits Department of the Air Force, Washington, DC, 15 June 1971
 AF Pamphlet 900-2, Unit Decorations, Awards and Campaign Participation Credits, Vol II Department of the Air Force, Washington, DC, 30 September 1976, p.

External links
 Tails Through Time: Short Trips on the Long Road of Aviation History – The 24th Combat Mapping Squadron:Unsung Heroes of the Pacific War Retrieved 10 July 2013.
 CBI Unit Histories – 24th Combat Mapping Squadron Retrieved 10 July 2013.
 "A Tale of Two Airplanes" by Kingdon R. "King" Hawes, Lt Col, USAF (Ret.)

024
Military units and formations disestablished in the 2020s